Pambos is a Cypriot masculine given name which may refer to:

 Pambos Christodoulou (born 1967), Cypriot football manager
 Pambos Christofi (born 1968), Cypriot retired footballer
 Pamboullis Papadopoulos (born 1947), Cypriot retired footballer
 Pambos Papageorgiou (born 1963), Cypriot politician
 Pambos Pittas (born 1966), Cypriot retired footballer

See also
 Pambo (305–c. 375), Catholic and Eastern Orthodox saint
 Vuyani Pambo, 21st century South African politician

Masculine given names